Belqeys Castle is a castle located in Esfarayen County in North Khorasan Province, Iran. The fortress dates back to the Sasanian Empire.

geographical location 
The remains of this ancient city are located 5 kilometers southwest of Esfarayen, on the eastern edge of Joshaghan village, in the northeastern cultural area, the GPS code of the region: 53°57° to 07°58° longitude and 31°36° to 17°37° latitude - The height above sea level in Balqis Castle is 1.202 meters.

Belqeys Castle has an area of over 51,000 square.

See also 
 Queen of Sheba

References 

Castles in Iran
Sasanian castles
Buildings and structures in North Khorasan Province